The England women's cricket team toured South Africa in 2004–05, playing two women's One Day Internationals prior to the 2005 Women's Cricket World Cup.

WODI series

1st ODI

2nd ODI

Tour matches

50-over tour match: England Women v Gauteng and North West Women

50-over tour match: England Women v Boland and Western Province Women

References

England
2005 in women's cricket
2005 in South African cricket
2005 in South African women's sport
2005 in English cricket
2005 in English women's sport
South Africa 2004
Women 2004-05
International cricket competitions in 2004–05
March 2005 sports events in Africa